This is a list of years in Transnistria. For only articles about years in Transnistria that have been written, see :Category:Years in Transnistria.

20th century 
Decade: 1990s

21st century 
Decades: 2000s ·
2010s ·
2020s

See also 

 
Transnistria